The 1996 AFC Asian Cup was the 11th edition of the men's AFC Asian Cup, a quadrennial international football tournament organised by the Asian Football Confederation (AFC). The finals were held in the United Arab Emirates between 4 and 21 December 1996. Saudi Arabia defeated hosts United Arab Emirates in the final match in Abu Dhabi. As the runners-up, the United Arab Emirates represented the AFC in the 1997 FIFA Confederations Cup as the winners Saudi Arabia had qualified automatically as host.

Qualification

33 teams participated in a preliminary tournament. It was divided into 10 groups and the first-placed team of each group thus qualified.

The qualifying teams were:

Notes:
1 Bold indicates champion for that year
2 Italic indicates host

Squads

Tournament summary
The tournament began with host United Arab Emirates took up against South Korea in group A, where the Emiratis played in a 1–1 draw. Subsequently, Kuwait was surprisingly held draw by Indonesia, even being taken lead by the Indonesians. However, the United Arab Emirates, Kuwait and South Korea eventually established its position, with South Korea finished in third place due to losing to Kuwait and inferior by goal differences and qualified only as one of two best third-placed team, while the host comfortably seized first place, leaving Indonesia in bottom after two consecutive defeats to South Korea and the UAE. 

Group B easily saw Saudi Arabia, Iran and Iraq took three leading places in their group, with both teams managed to beat Thailand, which finished bottom with three defeats, and also each three of them suffered one defeat one to another. Iraq only finished third due to inferior goal difference, but qualified as the best third-place finisher. 

Meanwhile, group C was more entertaining, with both three last finishers grabbed one win each only. Debutant Uzbekistan, on its just first ever competitive participation of a major tournament and was regarded low, stunned entire of Asia by beating China with two late goals to gain three points in the team's just first competitive match. Defending champions Japan however emerged as the only team to collect all three victories, while China recovered following the defeat to beat Syria. The Syrians grabbed its only win, a 2–1 win over Uzbekistan, but the team's poor performance, with two defeats to Japan and China, cost the team from reaching the quarter-finals. Uzbekistan finished last despite the win over China, and was eliminated as well. 

The quarter-finals saw entire of East Asia slumped out. Defending champions Japan was crushed down by Kuwait, China lost after a seven-goal thriller with Saudi Arabia, while South Korea suffered a denting 2–6 loss to Iran, with Iran scored five goals in the second half. The host UAE continued its quest to win the trophy with a successful 1–0 win over Iraq thanked for the golden goal of Abdulrahman Ibrahim. The semi-finals became a West Asian affair and rematches of group A and B: Saudi Arabia took a successful revenge on Iran following the group stage, beating the Iranians on penalty, while the UAE killed Kuwaiti dream for the second time with another 1–0 win to set up final with Saudi Arabia. Iran eventually took third place after beating Kuwait on penalty, the match ended 1–1 draw. 

The final between the UAE and Saudi Arabia happened to be boring than expected. The two teams played defensively and lacking enthusiastic attacks in front of 60,000 spectators. Eventually, penalty had to be brought out, where the UAE missed two while Saudi Arabia only missed one, thus Saudi Arabia was crowned for its third trophy in the country's fourth consecutive Asian Cup final. Thanked for the win, Saudi Arabia gained automatic berth to qualify for the 2000 AFC Asian Cup held in Lebanon.

Venues

First round
All times are UAE time (UTC+4)

Group A

Group B

Group C

Third-placed qualifiers
At the end of the first stage, a comparison was made between the third placed teams of each group. The two best third-placed teams advanced to the quarter-finals.

Iraq (best third-place) and South Korea (second best third-place) qualified for the quarter-finals.

Knockout stage
All times are UAE time (UTC+4)

Quarter-finals

Semi-finals

Third place play-off

Final

Statistics

Goalscorers
With eight goals, Iran's Ali Daei is the top scorer of the tournament. In total, 80 goals were scored by 47 different players, with one of them credited as an own goal.

8 goals
 Ali Daei

6 goals
 Jasem Al-Huwaidi

4 goals
 Fahad Al-Mehallel

3 goals

 Hwang Sun-Hong
 Hassan Saeed

2 goals

 Zhang Enhua
 Widodo Putro
 Ronny Wabia
 Khodadad Azizi
 Karim Bagheri
 Haidar Mahmoud
 Laith Hussein
 Masakiyo Maezono
 Kim Do-Hoon
 Sami Al-Jaber
 Khalid Al-Temawi
 Yousuf Al-Thunayan
 Nader Joukhadar
 Adnan Al-Talyani

1 goal

 Gao Feng
 Ma Mingyu
 Li Bing
 Peng Weiguo
 Mehrdad Minavand
 Naeim Saadavi
 Hussam Fawzi
 Khalid Mohammed Sabbar
 Kazuyoshi Miura
 Hiroshi Nanami
 Naoki Soma
 Takuya Takagi
 Ko Jeong-Woon
 Shin Tae-Yong
 Bashar Abdullah
 Badr Haji
 Hani Al Saqer
 Khalid Al-Muwallid
 Ali Cheikh Dib
 Dusit Chalermsan
 Kiatisuk Senamuang
 Abdulrahman Ibrahim
 Saad Bakheet Mubarak
 Khamis Saad
 Sergey Lebedev
 Oleg Shatskikh
 Igor Shkvyrin

1 own goal
 Hassan Abbas (for Japan)

Awards
Best player
 Khodadad Azizi

Top scorer
 Ali Daei

Best goalkeeper
 Mohamed Al-Deayea

Fair play award

Team of the Tournament

Final standings

References

External links
RSSSF Details

 
AFC Asian Cup tournaments
Afc Asian Cup, 1996
Asian Cup
International association football competitions hosted by the United Arab Emirates
December 1996 sports events in Asia